Postal codes in North Macedonia are 4 digits in length. They are divided according to post offices at particular regional centers.

External links
Postal Numbers in North Macedonia

North Macedonia
Communications in North Macedonia